Daron Alfred Cruickshank (born 17 June 1986) is a Trinidadian cricketer who has played for both Trinidad and Tobago and the Leeward Islands in West Indian domestic cricket.

Cruickshank made his senior debut for Trinidad and Tobago in October 2008, playing in an exhibition match against England that was part of the 2008 Stanford Super Series. His first-class debut came the following year, during the 2008–09 Regional Four Day Competition. For the 2015–16 Regional Four Day Competition, Cruickshank switched to play for the Leeward Islands. In his second game for the Leewards, against Guyana, he scored a maiden first-class half-century, 57 runs from 83 balls.

References

External links
Player profile and statistics at CricketArchive
Player profile and statistics at ESPNcricinfo

1986 births
Living people
Leeward Islands cricketers
Cricketers from Port of Spain
Trinidad and Tobago cricketers
Trinidad and Tobago representative cricketers